Doğanay Kılıç (born 8 June 1996) is a Turkish footballer who plays as a midfielder for TFF Third League club Bursa Yıldırımspor.

Career
Doğanay made his Süper Lig debut on 19 May 2013 with Bursaspor against Gençlerbirliği.

References

External links
 
 
 
 
 
 

1996 births
People from Bafra
Living people
Turkish footballers
Turkey youth international footballers
Association football midfielders
Bursaspor footballers
Gaziantepspor footballers
Göztepe S.K. footballers
Adanaspor footballers
İstanbul Başakşehir F.K. players
Kastamonuspor footballers
Kahramanmaraşspor footballers
Pendikspor footballers
Süper Lig players
TFF First League players
TFF Second League players
TFF Third League players